Jennifer Jako (born 1973) is an AIDS activist, filmmaker, photographer, lecturer and designer. She is the co-director of the documentary film, Blood Lines, a portrait of HIV-positive youth. Following her infection with HIV at age 18, she began educating in the hopes of preventing HIV infection in young people.

Background
Jako was born in Drumright, Oklahoma, to an Italian mother from  near Trieste and Hungarian father from Nagykovácsi near Budapest. Jako's nomadic childhood was abusive, impoverished and sometimes homeless.

The countries and states she grew up in include: Oklahoma, Illinois, New York, Colorado, Oregon, Mexico, Canada, Italy, Hungary, the Netherlands, England, Germany, Belgium, Austria, Switzerland, France, Spain, Turkey and Morocco. She is fluent in Spanish, French, Italian and English and speaks some Hungarian, Dutch and German. She attended Summit County High School in Frisco, Colorado, Glencoe High School in Hillsboro, Oregon, Lake Oswego High School in Lake Oswego, Oregon, and Grant High School in Portland, Oregon. She graduated from the latter in 1991.

She studied fine art at Ecole Supérieure d’Arts Plastiques in Monte Carlo, Monaco in 1991 and the Pacific Northwest College of Art (PNCA) from 1993 to 1995 in Portland. After an initial six months of sexual activity at age 18, she became abstinent.

She found out she was HIV positive at age 18 from a routine Pap test appointment at which a nurse encouraged her to get tested for HIV as she had had six partners. Jako did not consider herself to be at risk for HIV nor Sexually Transmitted Infections (STIs) and took the test out of social responsibility. When diagnosed, she was told she would be lucky to live to age 25. During her studies at PNCA, she began work with another HIV-positive woman, Rebecca Guberman, on a documentary film, Blood Lines, which would later be broadcast on MTV as True Life: It Could Be You from 1999– 2004. Production assistance came from the Paul Robeson Fund for Independent Media, Wieden & Kennedy and the Henry J. Kaiser Family Foundation. It is now distributed as an educational video. An updated version of Blood Lines was released in 2015.

HIV Medications or HAART
Jako took AZT for two weeks when first diagnosed, but became so ill that she stopped taking the drug. Afterward, she remained drug-naïve until 1997. After extensive research and pressured by a failing immune system, Jako began a regimen of Nevirapine, 3TC, and d4T. In 1998, she replaced d4T in her regimen with Abacavir because d4T caused severe side effects. Jako has permanent truncal adiposity (a collection of fat at the waist, back and neck, and wasting in the extremities.) She experiences dangerously elevated lipid levels, both cholesterol and triglycerides due to side effects from her medications. The elevated lipids required the addition of Gemfibrozil to control them.

While a treatment advocate, Jako emphasizes the need for patient education and a holistic approach. Her long-term success on one three drug combination or HAART is the result of perfect adherence since 1997. , Jako has had complete viral suppression for over 24 years.

HIV and family planning
Jako married Christopher John Bleiler in 2001. They had a child in 2005, through artificial home self-insemination. In 2006, their daughter was born via vaginal delivery. At nine years old (2017), her daughter is HIV-negative. Jako continued her strict adherence to a HAART regimen during pregnancy and did not breastfeed her daughter.

Public work and activism

Lectures
Universities: Elon, Colgate, Hampshire, Idaho State, Michigan, Washington State, Old Dominion, Virginia Commonwealth, Lewis & Clark, Oregon Health Sciences, Virginia Wesleyan College, Reed, Johns Hopkins, Vassar 
Conferences: Native American Youth Leadership, Sex & TV, Ryan White National Youth, Unitarian Universalist
Briefings: Capitol Hill Congressional Staff, MTV – National HIV Testing Day, NBPA Supersonics

Media Profiles
 Newsweek cover and The Faces of HIV
 ABC Afterschool Special: Sex Unplugged
Glamour
The Oregonian cover article
The Jenny Jones Show
 Independent Film & Video Monthly
 POZ Magazine,
 The New York Times
 USA Today
Ladies Home Journal
 Lifetime Television: Full of Hope
 Discovery Channel: Changing Faces, AIDS in America.
 Sally Jessy Raphael Show

Book Profiles
Girlfriends, Jane Wexler & Loren Cowen, Running Press
Women of Courage, Katherine Martin, New World Library

Awards
Red Ribbon Award, Coalition for AIDS Education
Ribbon of Hope, TV Cares, Academy of TV Arts & Sciences
Gold World Medal and Best Public Affairs Program, New York Festivals
Golden Eagle Award, CINE
Nominee: Information Programs, Banff Rockie Awards
Best Short, Awarded by Matt Groening at 26th Northwest Film & Video Festival Program

References

External links

 Bloodlines by Jennifer Jako, Ferment Newsletter
Series of interviews with Jennifer Jako

Living people
HIV/AIDS activists
People with HIV/AIDS
American people of Hungarian descent
American people of Italian descent
1973 births
People from Creek County, Oklahoma
Artists from Oregon
American documentary filmmakers
Pacific Northwest College of Art alumni
Grant High School (Portland, Oregon) alumni